Longitarsus aramaicus is a species of beetle in the subfamily Galerucinae that can be found on Cyprus, and in Asian countries such as Israel, Jordan, Turkey, and Ramallah, Palestine.

References

A
Beetles described in 1979
Beetles of Asia